Christoph Frankopan (1482 – 22 September 1527) was a Croatian count from the noble House of Frankopan. As a supporter of King John I of Hungary during the succession crisis between John Zápolya and Ferdinand Habsburg, he was named the ban of Croatia in 1526, and died in battle fighting alongside supporters of Zápolya.

Life 
Frankopan was born in 1482, son of the Croatian nobleman Bernardin Frankopan (1452–1529), a loyal man to the King Matthias Corvinus of Hungary, and Luisa of Aragon. Decades later, after the death of the King Matthias, the Hungarian crown passed to the Polish-Lithuanian House of Jagiellon with Vladislas II of Hungary in 1490. Christoph grew loyal to the new King and decades later bravely fought against Venice and the Ottoman Empire under emperor Maximilian I and Louis II of Hungary (Vladislas II's son). In 1496, due to the Frankopan family's influence, Christoph's sister, Beatrice de Frangepan, was married by John Corvinus, the illegitimate son of the deceased King Matthias of Hungary. After the defeat of Hungary against Ottoman Empire at the Battle of Mohács (1526), the Hungarian throne again was empty with the death of Louis II. Immediately the Habsburgs reclaimed it for themselves, as a Hungarian Count, John Zápolya, also claimed his rights as husband of a Jagiellon princess.

Most of the Croatian nobility gathered in Cetin and elected Ferdinand I as king on 1 January 1527. Christoph Frankopan was the sole member of the higher Croatian nobility who did not attend. The rival part of Croatian nobility, mostly from Slavonia, gathered on 6 January 1527 in Dubrava and intended to elect count John Zápolya as the king of Croatia. Eventually, both of them were crowned as Kings of Hungary, and Zápolya stayed in the royal city of Buda, as the Habsburg went back to his Austrian domains without giving up claim to the Hungarian throne. Zápolya conferred to Christopher the charge of ban of Croatia and military commander of the Hungarian Kingdom, counting him as one of his closest allies. In the civil war in Croatia, between army of Zápolya and Ferdinand he fought in Slavonia against Count Francis Batthyány, who supported the Habsburg's claims. He was mortally wounded at the siege of the castle of Varaždin and soon died.

Marriages
His first wife was Apollonia Lang (died 1520), the older sister of the archbishop-cardinal of Salzburg Matthäus Lang von Wellenburg. His second wife was the Hungarian noblewoman Anna Drágffy, widow of László Kanizsay. Christoph had no children from any marriage.

See also 
 History of Croatia
 History of Hungary

References

1482 births
1527 deaths
15th-century Croatian people
16th-century Croatian people
15th-century Hungarian people
16th-century Hungarian people
Military leaders of the Italian Wars
Counts of Croatia
Bans of Croatia
Christoph
15th-century Croatian nobility
16th-century Croatian nobility
1520s in Croatia